The pale-fronted nigrita (Nigrita luteifrons) is a common species of estrildid finch found in Africa. It has an estimated global extent of occurrence of 2,500,000 km2.

It is widespread throughout the African tropical rainforest.

The IUCN has classified the species as being of least concern.

References

External links
BirdLife International species factsheet

pale-fronted nigrita
pale-fronted nigrita